Van Dusen is a surname. Notable people with the surname include:

Albert E. Van Dusen (1916–1999), American historian
Chris Van Dusen, American television writer
Clyde Van Dusen (1885–1951), American jockey and Thoroughbred racehorse trainer
Clyde Van Dusen (horse) (1926–1948), American Thoroughbred racehorse
Francis Lund Van Dusen (1912–1993), American judge
Fred Van Dusen (born 1937), American baseball player
George W. Van Dusen (1826–?), American businessman
Granville Van Dusen (born 1944), American actor
H. V. Van Dusen (died 1903), American civil servant and Los Angeles city council member
Janine B. Van Dusen, American judge 
Julie Van Dusen, Canadian journalist
Willis Van Dusen, American mayor

See also
Augustus S. F. X. Van Dusen, fictional detective
Callendar–Van Dusen equation
Van Dusen v. Barrack, United States Supreme Court case
George W. and Nancy B. Van Dusen House, mansion in Minneapolis, Minnesota, United States
VanDusen Botanical Garden, botanical garden in Vancouver, British Columbia, Canada

Surnames of Dutch origin